David J. Templeton (1954 – 24 March 1997) was a minister of the Presbyterian Church in Ireland who was murdered in 1997. He had come to public notice  when he was 'outed' as a gay man by the Sunday Life newspaper.

Life 

David Templeton was born in Larne.  After leaving school he had worked as a civil servant.  In 1976 he had a kidney transplant, the donor being his mother.  This led him to change direction in his life and study at the Open University intending to go into the Presbyterian ministry.  After further studies he was ordained in 1985.  As a minister he was a regular contributor to radio broadcasts on Downtown Radio and the BBC.

Christian ministry 
Templeton was a graduate of the University of Ulster at Jordanstown (B.A.), Queen's University of Belfast, (M.Th.), and Princeton Theological Seminary (M.Div.), and served as Minister of Trinity, Greyabbey Presbyterian Church near Newtownards, County Down; and previously as Assistant Minister of Duncairn and St Enoch's Presbyterian Church in Belfast.

Death 
On 7 February 1997 three men wearing balaclavas entered his home in north Belfast, Northern Ireland, and beat him with baseball bats with spikes driven through them. Following the attack, which had the elements of a paramilitary punishment beating, Templeton was found with a fractured jaw, fractures to both legs and multiple cuts and abrasions to his arms and legs. At the time of the attack, he was one of Northern Ireland's longest surviving kidney transplantees.

He remained in hospital for several weeks, but was then released as he appeared to be recovering.  He died on 24 March after suffering a heart attack caused by thrombosis due to his immobility after the attack. He was 43 years old. He was buried in Larne, County Antrim.  500 mourners attended his funeral in Gardenmore Presbyterian Church, including his wheelchair-using mother and the then moderator of the Presbyterian Church.  No group has claimed responsibility for his murder, but it is widely believed that the assault was carried out by elements of the Ulster Volunteer Force, a loyalist paramilitary group.

When the attack took place, Templeton was living in the Ballyduff estate in Newtownabbey. He had recently stepped down as Minister of Trinity Presbyterian Church, Greyabbey, following a front-page story in the Sunday Life newspaper which revealed that he had recently been stopped by customs officials at Belfast International Airport in possession of a gay pornographic video. Templeton co-operated with the authorities and acknowledged that he had purchased the video quite legally from a high street chain store while he was on holiday in Amsterdam. After investigation, including a search of his church manse, the Royal Ulster Constabulary determined to take no further action. A customs official subsequently approached the Sunday Life newspaper and received payment for detailing the incident and revealing Templeton's identity. Following exposure by the press, he stood down as minister of his congregation, having been told by congregational leaders that his position was untenable. Left without a home, he moved into a rented council house in the Ballyduff estate while exploring alternative career opportunities.

Allegations of police collusion 
In 2002, David Templeton's murder was re-examined using the latest forensic science techniques, but this did not lead to any arrests.  In 2004, Johnston Brown, a retired detective sergeant, claimed that the RUC covered up murders by Mark Haddock, a UVF commander and RUC informer. Templeton identified Haddock in hospital as his assailant.

In January 2007, the Police Ombudsman issued a report implicating several special branch officers in failing to act on evidence that linked an informer to at least ten murders, but contrary to earlier press speculation the murder of David Templeton was not one of those mentioned, although it did state that further cases are being investigated. To date, no-one has ever been arrested in relation to the murder of David Templeton.

References
CAIN
Sunday Life
Times Online

1954 births
1997 deaths
Presbyterian ministers from Northern Ireland
Murder victims from Northern Ireland
Alumni of Ulster University
Alumni of Queen's University Belfast
Alumni of the Open University
People murdered in Northern Ireland
People from Larne
Kidney transplant recipients
1997 murders in the United Kingdom
Paramilitary punishment attacks in Northern Ireland
Violence against gay men
Violence against LGBT people in the United Kingdom
Violence against men in the United Kingdom